Europtera pandani is a species of Lasiocampidae moth native to Madagascar.

References
 

Lasiocampidae
Lepidoptera of Madagascar
Moths described in 1972
Moths of Madagascar
Moths of Africa